Caledoniscincus is a genus of lizards in the family Scincidae (skinks). The genus is endemic to New Caledonia.

Species
The following 14 species are recognized as being valid:
Caledoniscincus aquilonius  -  northern litter skink
Caledoniscincus atropunctatus  - speckled litter skink
Caledoniscincus auratus  - Koumac litter skink
Caledoniscincus austrocaledonicus  - common litter skink
Caledoniscincus chazeaui  - Chazeau's litter skink
Caledoniscincus constellatus 
Caledoniscincus cryptos  - cryptic litter skink 
Caledoniscincus festivus  - giant litter skink
Caledoniscincus haplorhinus  - Strand litter skink
Caledoniscincus notialis  - southern litter skink
Caledoniscincus orestes  - Panié litter skink
Caledoniscincus pelletieri  - Pelletier's litter skink
Caledoniscincus renevieri  - Renevier's litter skink
Caledoniscincus terma  - Mandjélia litter skink

Nota bene: A binomial authority in parentheses indicates that the species was originally described in a genus other than Caledoniscincus.

References

Further reading
 (1987). "A review of the scincid lizards of New Caledonia". Records of the Australian Museum 39 (1): 1-66. (Caledoniscincus, new genus, p. 37).

 
Lizard genera
Endemic fauna of New Caledonia
Taxa named by Ross Allen Sadlier
Skinks of New Caledonia